The Sand River is a major tributary of the Beaver River in Alberta, Canada.

Course
From there it flows generally towards the south and west. It enters the Caribou Lake, then continues north-west and west until it receives the waters of Ipiatik River, then turns south. It flows between Standish Lake, Spencer Lake and Seibert Lake, east of the Lakeland Provincial Park, then receives the waters of Wolf River, west of Wolf Lake. It receives the Punk Creek from Pinehurst Lake before it is crosses by Highway 55 (part of the Northern Woods and Water Route) at Truman. The Beaver River is a major tributary of the Churchill River, which flows east into Hudson Bay.

Tributaries
Caribou Lake
Ipiatik River
Wolf River
Punk Creek (from Pinehurst Lake)

See also
List of rivers of Alberta
Hudson Bay drainage basin

References

Rivers of Alberta